Eisenacher Straße is a Berlin U-Bahn station located on the .
R.G. Rümmler constructed this station which was opened 1971.
The wall is covered with green asbestos cement panels. Since Eisenach is a city near the forest in Thuringia, which is called the green heart of Germany, Rümmler chose green as the color of this station. The next station is Kleistpark.

Notes 

U7 (Berlin U-Bahn) stations
Buildings and structures in Tempelhof-Schöneberg
Railway stations in Germany opened in 1971